Dr. Ferdinand Lumban Tobing Airport (also known as Pinangsori Airport)  is an airport serving the city of Sibolga in the North Sumatra province of Indonesia.

Airlines and destinations

The following destinations are served from this airport:

See also

 Ferdinand Lumbantobing

References

Airports in North Sumatra